The Aerfer Ariete (Italian for Ram) was a prototype fighter aircraft built in Italy in 1958. It was a refined derivative of the Aerfer Sagittario 2, and was an attempt to bring that aircraft up to a standard where it could be mass-produced as a viable combat aircraft.

Retaining most of the Sagittario 2's layout with a nose intake and ventral exhaust for the main Derwent engine, the Ariete added a Rolls-Royce Soar RS.2 auxiliary turbojet engine to provide additional power for climbing and sprinting. This used a dorsal, retractable intake with its exhaust at the tail.

No production ensued; a proposed version with a de Havilland Spectre rocket engine instead of the auxiliary turbojet, the Aerfer Leone, was abandoned before a prototype could be built.

Operators

 Italian Air Force  operated two aircraft for evaluation test

Specifications (Ariete)

See also

References

Bibliography

 Buttler, Tony. X-Planes of Europe II: Military Prototype Aircraft from the Golden Age 1946–1974. Manchester, UK: Hikoki Publications, 2015. 
 Swanborough, Gordon. Air Enthusiast, Volume One. London: Pilot Press, 1971. .

Ariete
Abandoned military aircraft projects of Italy
1950s Italian fighter aircraft
Twinjets
Low-wing aircraft
Aircraft first flown in 1958